Mutarelli is an Italian surname. Notable people with the surname include:

Lourenço Mutarelli (born 1964), Brazilian comic book artist, writer, and actor
Massimo Mutarelli (born 1978), Italian footballer

Italian-language surnames